Huntsman spiders, members of the family Sparassidae (formerly Heteropodidae), are known by this name because of their speed and mode of hunting. They are also called giant crab spiders because of their size and appearance. Larger species sometimes are referred to as wood spiders, because of their preference for woody places (forests, mine shafts, woodpiles, wooden shacks). In southern Africa the genus Palystes are known as rain spiders or lizard-eating spiders. Commonly, they are confused with baboon spiders from the Mygalomorphae infraorder, which are not closely related.

More than a thousand Sparassidae species occur in most warm temperate to tropical regions of the world, including much of Australasia, Africa, Asia, the Mediterranean Basin, and the Americas.

Several species of huntsman spider can use an unusual form of locomotion. The wheel spider (Carparachne aureoflava) from the Namib uses a cartwheeling motion which gives it its name, while Cebrennus rechenbergi uses a handspring motion.

Description

Sparassids are eight-eyed spiders. The eyes appear in two largely forward-facing rows of four on the anterior aspect of the prosoma. People unfamiliar with spider taxonomy commonly confuse large species with tarantulas, but huntsman spiders can generally be identified by their legs, which, rather than being jointed vertically relative to the body, are twisted in such a way that in some attitudes the legs extend forward in a crab-like fashion.

On their upper surfaces the main colours of huntsman spiders are inconspicuous shades of brown or grey, but many species have undersides more or less aposematically marked in black-and-white, with reddish patches over the mouthparts. Their legs bear fairly prominent spines, but the rest of their bodies are smoothly furry. They tend to live under rocks, bark and similar shelters, but human encounters are common in sheds, garages and other infrequently-disturbed places. The banded huntsman (Holconia) is large, grey to brown with striped bands on its legs. The badge huntsman (Neosparassus) is larger still, brown and hairy. The tropical or brown huntsman (Heteropoda) is also large and hairy, with mottled brown, white and black markings. The eyesight of these spiders is not nearly as good as that of the Salticidae (jumping spiders). Nevertheless, their vision is quite sufficient to detect approaching humans or other large animals from some distance.

Identification 
They can be distinguished from other spider families by their appearance, as other spiders similar to them are smaller in size. They are often confused for tarantulas due to their hairy nature, but can easily be distinguished by their laterigrade legs, similar to those of crabs. Members of this family are also typically less bulky than tarantulas. They possess two claws, as is the case for most spiders that actively hunt their prey. If this is not enough to fully identify them, they also possess eight eyes divided into two regular rows.

Size, venom, and aggression

Like most spiders, Sparassidae use venom to immobilize prey. They have been known to inflict serious defensive bites on humans.

There have been reports of members of various genera such as Palystes, Neosparassus and several others, inflicting severe bites. The effects vary, including local swelling and pain, nausea, headache, vomiting, irregular pulse rate, and heart palpitations, indicating some systemic neurological toxin effects, especially when the bites were severe or repeated. However, the formal study of spider bites is fraught with complications, including unpredictable infections, dry bites, shock, nocebo effects, and even bite misdiagnosis by medical professionals and specimen misidentification by the general public.

It is not always clear what provokes Sparassidae to attack and bite humans and animals, but it is known that female members of this family will aggressively defend their egg-sacs and young against perceived threats. Bites from sparassids usually do not require hospital treatment.

Sound-production in mating-rituals
Males of Heteropoda venatoria, one of the huntsman spiders that seems to easily find its way around the world, have recently been found to deliberately make a substrate-borne sound when they detect a chemical (pheromone) left by a nearby female of their species. The males anchor themselves firmly to the surface onto which they have crawled and then use their legs to transmit vibrations from their bodies to the surface. Most of the sound emitted is produced by strong vibrations of the abdomen. The characteristic frequency of vibration and the pattern of bursts of sound identify them to females of their species, who will approach if they are interested in mating. This sound can often be heard as a rhythmic ticking, somewhat like a quartz clock, which fades in and out and can be heard by human ears in a relatively quiet environment.

Genera

, the World Spider Catalog accepted the following genera:

Adcatomus Karsch, 1880 — Venezuela, Peru
Anaptomecus Simon, 1903 — Central America, South America
Anchonastus Simon, 1898 — Cameroon, Congo
Arandisa Lawrence, 1938 — Namibia
Barylestis Simon, 1910 — Africa, Asia, Europe
Beregama Hirst, 1990 — Australia, Papua New Guinea
Berlandia Lessert, 1921 — East Africa
Bhutaniella Jäger, 2000 — Asia
Borniella Grall & Jäger, 2022 — Borneo
Caayguara Rheims, 2010 — Brazil
Carparachne Lawrence, 1962 — Namibia
Cebrennus Simon, 1880 — Africa, Asia, Malta
Cerbalus Simon, 1897 — Israel, Jordan, Egypt
Chrosioderma Simon, 1897 — Madagascar
Clastes Walckenaer, 1837 — Indonesia, Papua New Guinea
Curicaberis Rheims, 2015 — North America, Central America, Brazil
Damastes Simon, 1880 — Madagascar, Mozambique, Seychelles
Decaphora Franganillo, 1931 — North America, Caribbean, Central America, Colombia
Deelemanikara Jäger, 2021 — Madagascar
Defectrix Petrunkevitch, 1925 — Panama
Delena Walckenaer, 1837 — Australia, New Zealand
Dermochrosia Mello-Leitão, 1940 — Brazil
Diminutella Rheims & Alayón, 2018 — Cuba
Eusparassus Simon, 1903 — Asia, Africa, Europe, Peru
Exopalystes Hogg, 1914 — Papua New Guinea
Extraordinarius Rheims, 2019 — Brazil
Geminia Thorell, 1897 — Myanmar
Gnathopalystes Rainbow, 1899 — Asia, Oceania
Guadana Rheims, 2010 — Brazil, Peru, Ecuador
Heteropoda Latreille, 1804 — Oceania, Asia, South America, Greece
Holconia Thorell, 1877 — Australia
Irileka Hirst, 1998 — Australia
Isopeda L. Koch, 1875 — Australia, Philippines, Papua New Guinea
Isopedella Hirst, 1990 — Australia, Papua New Guinea, Indonesia
Keilira Hirst, 1989 — Australia
Leucorchestris Lawrence, 1962 — Angola, Namibia
Macrinus Simon, 1887 — South America, Tobago, United States
Martensopoda Jäger, 2006 — India
May Jäger & Krehenwinkel, 2015 — Namibia, South Africa
Megaloremmius Simon, 1903 — Madagascar
Menarik Grall & Jäger, 2022 — Borneo
Meri Rheims & Jäger, 2022 — South America
Micrommata Latreille, 1804 — Spain, Africa, Asia
Micropoda Grall & Jäger, 2022 — Papua New Guinea
Microrchestris Lawrence, 1962 — Namibia
Neosparassus Hogg, 1903 — Australia
Neostasina Rheims & Alayón, 2016 — Caribbean
Nolavia Kammerer, 2006 — Brazil
Nungara Pinto & Rheims, 2016 — Brazil, Ecuador
Olios Walckenaer, 1837 — Asia, South America, Oceania, Africa, Central America, North America, Caribbean
Orchestrella Lawrence, 1965 — Namibia
Origes Simon, 1897 — Argentina, Peru, Ecuador
Paenula Simon, 1897 — Ecuador
Palystella Lawrence, 1928 — Namibia
Palystes L. Koch, 1875 — Africa, India, Australia
Panaretella Lawrence, 1937 — South Africa
Pandercetes L. Koch, 1875 — Asia, Oceania
Parapalystes Croeser, 1996 — South Africa
Pediana Simon, 1880 — Indonesia, Australia
Platnickopoda Jäger, 2020 — East Africa
Pleorotus Simon, 1898 — Seychelles
Polybetes Simon, 1897 — South America
Prusias O. Pickard-Cambridge, 1892 — Brazil, Mexico, Panama
Prychia L. Koch, 1875 — Papua New Guinea, Fiji, Philippines
Pseudomicrommata Järvi, 1914 — Africa
Pseudopoda Jäger, 2000 — Asia
Quemedice Mello-Leitão, 1942 — Brazil, Argentina
Remmius Simon, 1897 — Africa
Rhacocnemis Simon, 1897 — Seychelles
Rhitymna Simon, 1897 — Asia, Africa
Sadala Simon, 1880 — South America
Sagellula Strand, 1942 — Japan, China
Sarotesius Pocock, 1898 — East Africa
Sinopoda Jäger, 1999 — Asia
Sivalicus Dyal, 1957 — India
Sparianthina Banks, 1929 — South America, Tobago, Central America
Sparianthis Simon, 1880 — Colombia
Spariolenus Simon, 1880 — Asia
Staianus Simon, 1889 — Madagascar
Stasina Simon, 1877 — South America, Gabon, Asia, Cuba
Stasinoides Berland, 1922 — Ethiopia
Stipax Simon, 1898 — Seychelles
Strandiellum Kolosváry, 1934 — Papua New Guinea
Thelcticopis Karsch, 1884 — Asia, Oceania, Africa
Thomasettia Hirst, 1911 — Seychelles
Thunberga Jäger, 2020 — Madagascar
Tibellomma Simon, 1903 — Venezuela
Tiomaniella Grall & Jäger, 2022 — Malaysia
Tychicus Simon, 1880 — Philippines, Papua New Guinea, Indonesia
Typostola Simon, 1897 — Australia, Papua New Guinea
Uaiuara Rheims, 2013 — Panama, South America
Vindullus Simon, 1880 — South America, Guatemala
Yiinthi Davies, 1994 — Australia, Papua New Guinea
Zachria L. Koch, 1875 — Australia

Distribution and habitat
Members of the Sparassidae are native to tropical and warm temperate regions worldwide. A few species are native to colder climates, like the green huntsman spider (Micrommata virescens) which is native to Northern and Central Europe. Some tropical species like Heteropoda venatoria (Cane huntsman) and Delena cancerides (Social huntsman) have been accidentally introduced to many subtropical parts of the world, including New Zealand (which has no native sparassid species). The huntsman spiders found in southern parts of Florida are of the Heteropoda venatoria species and considered an invasive species transplanted from Asia. Because of their speed, they commonly hunt and eat cockroaches and are found in many homes.

As adults, huntsman spiders do not build webs, but hunt and forage for food: their diet consists primarily of insects and other invertebrates, and occasionally small skinks and geckos. They live in the crevices of tree bark, but will frequently wander into homes and vehicles. They are able to travel extremely quickly, often using a springing jump while running, and walk on walls and even on ceilings. They also tend to exhibit a "cling" reflex if picked up, making them difficult to shake off and much more likely to bite. The females are fierce defenders of their egg sacs and young. They will generally make a threat display if provoked, and if the warning is ignored they may attack and bite. The egg sacs differ fairly widely among the various genera. For example, in Heteropoda spp. egg sacs are carried underneath the female's body, while in other species like Palystes and Pseudomicrommata spp., females generally attach egg sacs to vegetation.

See also
 Cultural depictions of spiders (section: Modern myths and urban legends)
 List of Sparassidae species
 Spider wasp
 Table of spider families

References

Inline citations

General references

External links

 Images and information on Australian Huntsman Spiders Minibeast Wildlife
 Information page on Huntsman Spiders from the Australian Museum
 Badge Huntsman Spider at Victorian Museum
 Varieties of Sparassidae University of Southern Queensland – pictures & descriptions
 Remarkable Australian Lichen Huntsman  at American Arachnological Society
 Heteropoda venatoria at University of Florida Institute of Food and Agricultural Sciences
 Video of Olios sp. from Costa Rica

Taxa named by Philipp Bertkau